Eusynstyela is a genus of ascidian tunicates in the family Styelidae.

Species within the genus Eusynstyela include:
 Eusynstyela beuziti (Monniot C., 1970) 
 Eusynstyela floridana (Van Name, 1921) 
 Eusynstyela grandis Kott, 1990 
 Eusynstyela gravei (Van Name, 1931) 
 Eusynstyela hartmeyeri Michaelsen, 1904 
 Eusynstyela latericius (Sluiter, 1904) 
 Eusynstyela miniata (Sluiter, 1905) 
 Eusynstyela misakiensis (Watanabe & Tokioka, 1972) 
 Eusynstyela monotestis (Tokioka, 1953) 
 Eusynstyela ordinata (Monniot, 1983) 
 Eusynstyela phiala Monniot, 1991 
 Eusynstyela tincta (Van Name, 1902)

Species names currently considered to be synonyms:
 Eusynstyela aliena Monniot, 1991: synonym of Eusynstyela hartmeyeri Michaelsen, 1904 
 Eusynstyela caudata Monniot & Monniot, 1975: synonym of Polycarpa caudata Monniot C. & Monniot F., 1974 
 Eusynstyela discoidea Heller, 1877: synonym of Polycarpa discoidea Heller, 1877 
 Eusynstyela errans Hartmeyer, 1909-1911: synonym of Polycarpa errans Hartmeyer, 1909 
 Eusynstyela imthurni (Herdman, 1906): synonym of Eusynstyela latericius (Sluiter, 1904) 
 Eusynstyela transversalis (Tokioka, 1963): synonym of Tibitin transversalis (Tokioka, 1963)

References

Stolidobranchia
Tunicate genera